The Armeno-Phrygians are a hypothetical people of West Asia (specifically of Asia Minor and the Armenian Highlands) during the Bronze Age, the Bronze Age collapse, and its aftermath. 
They would be the common ancestors of both Phrygians and Proto-Armenians. In turn, Armeno-Phrygians would be the descendants of the Graeco-Phrygians, common ancestors of Greeks, Phrygians, and also of Armenians.

The term "Armeno-Phrygian" is also used for a hypothetical language branch, which would include the languages spoken by the Phrygians and the Armenians, and would be a branch of the Indo-European language family, or a sub-branch of either the proposed "Graeco-Armeno-Aryan" or "Armeno-Aryan" branches.

There are two conflicting theories regarding the potential origins of the Armeno-Phrygians:

 Ancient Greek historian Herodotus stated that Armenians were colonists from Phrygia ("the Armenians were equipped like Phrygians, being Phrygian colonists" (Ἀρμένιοι δὲ κατά περ Φρύγες ἐσεσάχατο, ἐόντες Φρυγῶν ἄποικοι)(7.73). Phrygia encompassed much of western and central Anatolia during the Iron Age. According to Ancient Greeks, the Phrygians had originated in the Balkans as Bryges. This led some scholars to suggest that Armenians also originated in the Balkans. According to Igor Diakonoff, the Phrygians and the Proto-Armenians migrated eastward during the Bronze Age collapse (at the end of the 13th century and the first half of 12th century). This theory suggests that Proto-Armenians were known by the name of Mushki to the Assyrians and that they blended with the ancient populations of the Armenian Highlands, including speakers of Hurro-Urartian languages, to create Armenians. Assyrian sources identify the Mushki with the Phrygians, but later Greek sources then distinguish between the Phrygians and the Moschoi (commonly though to be a variation of "Mushki"). 
 Some modern scholars instead believe that a proto-Armeno-Phrygian population originated in eastern Anatolia and/or the Armenian Highlands, from where the Phrygians later migrated westward.

According to some scholars, there is evidence of language borrowings (Armenisms) from the Proto-Armenian language into Hittite and Urartian, what would prove the presence of Proto-Armenians in the Armenian Highlands, in the lands of ancient Armenia, since at least the end of the 2nd millennium BC.

Criticism
A number of linguists have rejected a close relationship between Armenian and Phrygian, despite saying that the two languages do share some features. Phrygian is now classified as a centum language more closely related to Greek than Armenian, whereas Armenian is mostly satem.

Recent research suggests that there is lack of archaeological and genetic evidence for a group from the Balkans entering eastern Asia Minor or the Armenian Highlands during or after the Bronze Age Collapse (as was suggested by Diakonoff).

Some scholars have suggested that the Mushki (whether they were speakers of Armenian or another language) originated in the Caucasus region and moved westward.

See also
Armeno-Phrygian (language clade)
Origin of the Armenians
List of ancient Armeno-Phrygian peoples and tribes
Sea peoples
Bronze Age collapse
Armenian hypothesis
Urartu

References

Ancient peoples of Anatolia
Prehistoric Armenia